"I'll Come Back as Another Woman" is a song written by Kent Robbins and Richard E. Carpenter, and recorded by American country music artist Tanya Tucker.  It was released in November 1986 as the third single from the album Girls Like Me.  The song reached #2 on the Billboard Hot Country Singles & Tracks chart.

Chart performance

References

External links
 

1987 singles
1986 songs
Tanya Tucker songs
Songs written by Kent Robbins
Capitol Records Nashville singles
Song recordings produced by Jerry Crutchfield